Patawomeck is a Native American tribe based in Stafford County, Virginia, along the Potomac River. Patawomeck is another spelling of Potomac. 

The Patawomeck Indian Tribe of Virginia is a state-recognized tribe in Virginia that identifies as descendants of the Patawomeck.

Language 
The Patawomeck spoke an Eastern Algonquian language. The Patawomeck were one of 32 Algonquian-speaking peoples in the Tidewater area of present-day Virginia. While the Patawomeck dialect may be in danger of extinction, Algonquin, the proto-Algonquian language, is spoken widely in the northern east to middle US as well as Canada. Citation: The Heritage Language Project.

Revitalization efforts are underway. Classes use the audio and printed materials prepared by the linguist Blair Rudes for cast members who portrayed Native Americans in the film, The New World. Rudes reconstructed the Algonquian language as it was spoken in coastal Virginia in the early 17th century.

History
For thousands of years various cultures of Indigenous peoples of the Northeastern Woodlands lived along the Potomac River and its tributaries in the coastal area. Archeological excavations have yielded much data about the prehistoric early cultures. At Indian Point on Potomac Creek, for instance, part of the later Patawomeck area, archeological excavations in the 1930s revealed a Native American burial ground (Potomac Creek, 44ST2). Researchers donated 134 skeletons from the grounds to the Smithsonian Institution.  Now that the Patawomeck tribe has been recognized by the state, they may undertake claiming the remains for repatriation and burial under the Native American Graves Protection and Repatriation Act (NAGPRA), though a tribe has to be federally recognized to utilize NAGPRA without extra petitioning.

More recently, a 1996 archeological study by the College of William and Mary revealed Native American artifacts dating back to the 15th century. More than 10,000 artifacts were recovered, mostly pottery sherds of the "wrapped-cord type" common among local indigenous people. While the ancient village site is protected under historic preservation laws, the land is being steadily eroded by the creek. The coastal peoples were part of the Algonquian-speaking language family that coalesced into differentiated tribes from present-day New England into the southern states.

The historical Patawomeck tribe were loosely allied with the powerful Powhatan Confederacy. They were an agrarian people, who cultivated varieties of maize. They also relied on hunting, fishing, and gathering resources from their rich environment.

17th century 
The first recorded European encounter was that of the English leader Captain John Smith, who visited the people in 1608 in their homeland, between Aquia Creek and Upper Machodoc Creek. He noted they were cultivating  of corn along the Potomac River. The Patawomeck main town, also called Patawomeck, was located on the north of Potomac Creek, in present-day Stafford County. The weroance of Passapatanzy, a satellite village, was Japazeus (also spelled Japazaws or Iopassus), older brother to the main weroance.

The Patawomeck were semi-independent of the Powhatan Confederacy of Chief Powhatan to the south. They befriended the English colonists (Captain Samuel Argall in particular), often providing them crucial assistance when the Powhatan would not. When the colonists faced starvation at Jamestown in 1609, Francis West was sent to buy corn from the Patawomeck. In a violent confrontation, he beheaded two of them and fled in his pinnace to England.

Argall made peace with the Patawomeck in 1612, during the First Anglo-Powhatan War. According to contemporary accounts by Ralph Hamor and others, on 13 April 1613, Argall, with the connivance of Japazaw in exchange for a copper kettle, was able to capture Chief Powhatan's daughter, Pocahontas who lived with the Patawomeck tribe for three years. Argall was on a goods trading mission for her father.

Current Mattaponi tradition holds that she was the wife of Kocoum, brother of the Patawomeck weroance Japazaws, and that Argall's soldiers killed Kocoum after her capture in 1613. Today's Patawomecks believe that Pocahontas and Kocoum had a daughter, Ka-Okee, who lived with the Patawomecks after her father's death and her mother's abduction. Englishman William Strachey, who was the Secretary and Recorder for the Colony of Virginia in 1610 and 1611, recorded that Pocahontas had been living married to a "private captaine called Kocoum" for two years, as of 1610-11. Strachey returned to England in 1611 and later published a book on his travels. His book is considered the primary source of information on this period of Virginia history and its native peoples. Because of the various publishing dates of his book (in 1612 and 1616), some people have mistakenly thought Strachey was talking about the marriage of Pocahontas to John Rolfe, however, Strachey left Virginia many years before their marriage. Strachey made no mention of a child of the marriage to Kocoum, but he left Virginia before the child is purported to have been born.

The Patawomeck continued to ally with the English in their conflicts with the Powhatan in 1622 (even after Captain Isaac Madison took their weroance prisoner), and in 1644. After settlers began moving into their area in the 1650s, pressures mounted in competition over resources and differing ideas of how to use land. Violent disputes followed. In 1662, Colonel Giles Brent took their weroance Wahanganoche prisoner. After an extensive trial in Williamsburg, Wahanganoche was found not guilty and released. He was none the less murdered by Giles conspirators in 1663 while returning home from the trial. In October 1665, the colonial government forced the tribe to sell their remaining land to the colony for a few matchcoats.

In 1666 after continued conflicts, the English colonists declared war against several tribes in the Northern Neck, including the Patawomeck. After this, the Patawomeck disappeared from the historical record. A silver badge, issued to Wahanganoche in 1662, was found in a contemporary archeological excavation near Portobago (or Portobacco) on the Rappahannock River. It may indicate that the survivors merged with the Portobacco tribe, as did remnants of several other tribes.

20th century
In 1928, the anthropologist Frank Speck wrote of the Native American population living around the original Patawomeck capital. From his studies of the Algonquian peoples, he believed they were remnants of the old Patawomeck nation. Although without solid proof they were not from another tribe, he called them the "Potomac". Many families living in and around White Oak in Stafford County had oral histories linking them to the Patawomecks; these included families with the names Sullivan, Newton, Green, Bourne, Bullock, Fines, and Curtis. However, racism in Virginia caused many families to hide their Indian ancestry. In particular, Virginia's Racial Integrity Act of 1924 and the work of state Bureau of Vital Statistics registrar Walter Plecker ensured that for most of the 20th century, official records recognized Virginians as either "white" or "colored", erasing Indian heritage from the public record.

State-recognized tribe 
The Patawomeck Indian Tribe of Virginia is one of Virginia's eleven state-recognized Native American tribes. It is however not federally recognized. It achieved state recognition in February 2010. 
In the 17th century, at the time of early English colonization, the Patawomeck tribe was a "fringe" component of the Powhatan Confederacy.  At times it was allied with others in the confederacy, and at others, the Patawomeck allied with the English colonists.

Today the tribe has about 2,300 members. Eighty percent live within ten miles (16 km) of their historic village of Patawomeck.  They are trying to revive their historic Algonquian language.
In the 1990s, Robert "Two Eagles" Green, a native of White Oak and resident of Fredericksburg, worked to reorganize the tribe and began seeking state recognition. The tribe applied to the Virginia Council on Indians for recognition, and were told that they met five of the six criteria for recognition; however, the council felt that the Patawomecks were not able to prove that their group had continued to exist as a distinct Indian community through the years. The alleged Patawomecks felt that they had sufficient evidence to prove their continuous existence as a community, and persuaded Bill Howell, Speaker of the Virginia House of Delegates and representative for Stafford, to sponsor a bill for the tribe's recognition. In February 2010, Las Vegas singer Wayne Newton, whose father was Patawomeck (also of Irish descent), spoke before the House Rules Committee in support of recognition. In the same month, the measure was passed unanimously by the House of Delegates and the state Senate, marking official state recognition of the tribe. The same measure granted the Patawomecks a seat on the Virginia Council on Indians.

Robert "Two Eagles" Green was the chief of the tribe from its reorganization until 2013, when he retired and became Chief Emeritus. Green was an adviser to the filmmakers of The New World (2005), about the colony at Jamestown and the Native American peoples and cultures encountered by the colonists. Green appeared in the film in a non-speaking role; his son Jason Green also appeared as a Powhatan warrior. The Patawomecks provided the filmmakers with numerous wild turkey feathers and deer antlers to create authentic clothing for the Native American characters in the film. Green also portrayed Powhatan in the episode "Pocahontas Revealed" (2007) of PBS's Nova.

In 2013, Green was succeeded as chief by John Lightner. Today the tribe has approximately 2,300 members, most of whom live in Stafford County within ten miles of Patawomeck. In 2014, the tribe worked with Stafford High School to make the school's "Indian" mascot more representative of Virginia Indians. In 2019, John Lightner was succeeded by Charles Bullock as Chief.

References

External links
Patawomeck Indian Tribe of Virginia, official tribal web page
Patawomeck Heritage Foundation, a 501(c)(3) organization whose purpose is to promote and protect the culture and heritage of the Patawomeck Indians

Stafford County, Virginia
Algonquian peoples
Native American tribes in Virginia
Algonquian ethnonyms
Extinct languages of North America